On the Beat! is the debut album by British indie band, The KBC. The album was released 10 January 2007 via Japanese label Fabtone Records.

Track listing
"Poisonous Emblem" – 3:45
"Not Anymore" – 2:54
"Trippin" – 3:51
"Test the Water" – 3:56
"Day of Disillusion" – 3:45
"Busy Hands" – 3:41
"Pride Before the Fall" – 4:01
"Sherlock Groove Holmes" – 4:00
"Zeitgeist" – 3:58
"Best in the Business" – 3:46
"Mad With Me" – 5:00

Three tracks are available only on the Japanese release of the album:
"You Are The Sign" – 4:52
"Divide The Rule" – 3:51
"Steven Get Even" – 3:42

2007 albums
The KBC albums